The 1956 United States Senate special election in West Virginia took place on November 6, 1956, to elect a U.S. Senator to complete the unexpired term of Senator Harley M. Kilgore, who died on February 28. 1956. State Tax Commissioner William Laird III was appointed to fill this seat by Governor William C. Marland to fill the vacancy until a special election could be held and assumed office on March 13, 1956.

Laird did not opt to run in the special election to fill the remainder of Kilgore's term through the end of the 85th Congress on January 3, 1959. Republican candidate Chapman Revercomb defeated Governor Marland in the special election.

, this is the last time the Republicans have won West Virginia's Class 1 seat. This was also the last time until 2014 that the Republicans won a U.S. Senate election in the state.

Primary elections
Primary elections were held on May 8, 1956.

Democratic primary

Candidates
Joseph Arcuri, children's writer
Walter G. Crichton, Charleston councilman, unsuccessful candidate for Democratic nomination for West Virginia's 6th congressional district in 1944
John G. Fox, incumbent Attorney General of West Virginia
William C. Marland, incumbent Governor of West Virginia
Byron B. Randolph, former President of the West Virginia Senate

Results

Republican primary

Candidates
Chapman Revercomb, former U.S. Senator
Thomas Sweeney, insurance agent, Republican candidate for U.S. Senator in 1940, 1946 and 1954
Philip H. Hill, attorney, Republican candidate for Attorney General of West Virginia in 1936
Al J. Carey, Kanawha County Sheriff
Esta C. Wilson, television dealer

Results

General election

Results

See also 
 1956 United States Senate elections

References

Bibliography
 
 

1956 Special
West Virginia Special
United States Senate Special
West Virginia 1956
West Virginia 1956
United States Senate 1956